XX – Two Decades of Love Metal is a compilation album by Finnish rock band HIM, released 26 October 2012 in Europe and 6 November 2012 in the U.S. It features all of the band's singles spanning from 1997 to 2010, as well as a cover of the song "Strange World", originally by the artist Ké. It is the band's second singles compilation, the first being And Love Said No: The Greatest Hits 1997–2004, released in 2004.

Track listing

References 

HIM (Finnish band) albums
2012 greatest hits albums